Kabalı is a village in the Yenice District of Çanakkale Province in Turkey. Its population is 229 (2021).

References

Villages in Yenice District, Çanakkale